Stream ripper may refer to:

Stream recorder, a program for recording data streams
Streamripper, a Stream recorder for audio streams